The MCW Women's Championship is a professional wrestling championship owned by the MCW Pro Wrestling  promotion. The title was created and debuted on October 3, 2014 at a MCW live event.

The inaugural champion was Renee Michelle, who defeated Amber Rodriguez in the finals of a tournament to win the championship on October 3, 2014 at an MCW live event.

The current champion is Gia Scott, who is in her fifth reign.

Title history

Combined reigns 

References

External links 
 mcwprowrestling.com

MCW Pro Wrestling championships
Women's professional wrestling championships